Bryan Watson may refer to:

 Bryan Watson (dancer) (born 1969), South African ballroom dancer
 Bryan Watson (ice hockey) (1942–2021), Canadian ice hockey defenseman

See also
Brian Watson (disambiguation)